Cerfontaine is a municipality of Wallonia located in the province of Namur, Belgium. 

On January 1, 2006, Cerfontaine had a total population of 4,546. The total area is 83.45 km² which gives a population density of 54 inhabitants per km².

The municipality consists of the following districts: Cerfontaine, Daussois, Senzeille, Silenrieux, Soumoy, and Villers-Deux-Églises.

The Eau d'Heure lakes are situated partly in this municipality and partly in neighbouring Froidchapelle.

History

Postal history
The CERFONTAINE post-office opened on 25 February 1860. It used a Distribution code 98 with vertical bars (before 1864), and 75 with
points before 1874. The SILENRIEUX post-office opened on 9 December 1899; SENZEILLES on 21 August 1906.

Code 5630 since at least 1990.

Postal codes in 1969 (before the merger of municipalities in 1977):
- 6355 Villers-Deux-Églises
- 6444 Silenrieux
- 6445 Daussois
- 6450 Cerfontaine
- 6451 Soumoy
- 6452 Senzeille.

Town twinning
 Louiseville, Quebec, Canada

References

External links
 
 List of protected heritage sites in Cerfontaine, Belgium

Municipalities of Namur (province)